Andrés Felipe Perea Castañeda (born November 14, 2000) is an American professional soccer player who plays as a defensive midfielder for Major League Soccer club Philadelphia Union.

Youth
Perea lived in Tampa, Florida, United States, for the first five years of his life, playing for Old Mars FC and West Florida Premier. He moved to Colombia where he enrolled in the Atlético Nacional youth academy aged six. In 2013, Perea was part of the Atlético Nacional team that won the prestigious national youth tournament .

Club career

Atlético Nacional
On July 10, 2017, Perea made his senior debut for Atlético Nacional as a 77th minute substitute in a 1–0 defeat to Santa Fe. In doing so he became the first player born in the 21st century to play for the club. He scored his first goal for the team on April 19, 2019, in a 4–0 victory over Patriotas.

Orlando City
On December 9, 2019, Perea joined MLS team Orlando City on loan ahead of the 2020 season. He made his debut for the team as a substitute on February 29, 2020 in the season opener as the team drew 0–0 with Real Salt Lake. A week later, Perea made his first start, registering an assist on the team's first goal of the season scored by Chris Mueller as Orlando lost 2–1 away to Colorado Rapids.

After making 28 appearances in his debut season with Orlando, Perea had his loan move made permanent as part of the club's end of season roster moves on December 2, 2020.

Perea scored his first goal in U.S. Open Cup competition on May 10, 2022, the winner in a 2–1 round of 32 victory over the Philadelphia Union.

Philadelphia Union
On December 6, 2022, Perea was traded to Philadelphia Union in exchange for $750,000 in General Allocation Money with the potential for an additional $100,000 in GAM if certain contract conditions are met and will also retain a portion of any future transfer fee.

International career
Born in Tampa, Florida, Perea holds dual citizenship with the United States and Colombia.

In 2017, Perea was part of the Colombia under-17 teams at both the Campeonato Sudamericano Sub-17 and FIFA U-17 World Cup. In May 2019, Perea was called up to the Colombia under-20 squad for the FIFA U-20 World Cup as an injury replacement for Yéiler Góez and started all five games as Colombia reached the quarter-finals before being eliminated by eventual winners Ukraine.

In December 2020, Perea was called up to the United States national team for the first time for a friendly against El Salvador as a replacement following Frankie Amaya's withdrawal but did not appear in the game. On January 12, 2021, while at a training camp with the United States under-23 team, it was announced that Perea was granted a one-time switch by FIFA to represent the United States competitively. He made his debut for the United States on January 31, 2021, as a half-time substitute for Sebastian Lletget in a 7–0 friendly win over Trinidad and Tobago. Perea conceded a penalty which was saved by Matt Turner.

Perea was named to the final 20-player United States under-23 roster for the 2020 CONCACAF Men's Olympic Qualifying Championship in March 2021.

Personal life
Andrés is the son of former soccer player and Atlético Nacional under-20 coach Nixon Perea.

Career statistics

Club

International

Honors
Orlando City
U.S. Open Cup: 2022

References

External links
 

2000 births
Living people
Soccer players from Tampa, Florida
Colombian footballers
Colombia youth international footballers
Olympic soccer players of the United States
United States men's international soccer players
American soccer players
American sportspeople of Colombian descent
People with acquired Colombian citizenship
Categoría Primera A players
Atlético Nacional footballers
Association football midfielders
Major League Soccer players
Orlando City SC players
United States men's under-23 international soccer players
Colombia under-20 international footballers